Australian rules football (referred to simply as "football" in all states except New South Wales and Queensland) is the most watched and attended sport and the second most participated code of football in Australia. Since originating in Victoria in 1858 and spreading elsewhere from 1866, it has been played continuously in every Australian state since 1903 plus the two major territories since 1916.

The sport is played by more than half a million Australians, players participate at an organised level in various forms from Auskick (age 5) through to school-based, underage (up to age 19), open age, to Masters (35+) competition. It is the second most participated code of football in Australia overall after soccer. The season runs in most states and territories during the cooler seasons in Australian (from March to September) avoiding clashes with cricket, with the exception being the northern part of the Northern Territory where the season runs during the wet season (October to March). The highest participation rates (players per capita) can be found in the Northern Territory (5%), South Australia (4.8%), Victoria (4.3%), Western Australia (4.2%) and Tasmania (3.3%). Unlike other football codes which are strongest in urban areas, Australian rules football has the highest participation in regional and remote areas. Nationally this rate is 5.7% almost double that of any other code. It is also fast growing in Queensland and New South Wales, though with participation rates of 1.3% and 1.1% respectively lags behind soccer and rugby league in overall interest. These two states represent more than half of the Australian population and this dichotomy of football culture is referred to as the Barassi Line. South Australia is the only state or territory where it is the most participated code of football.

The national professional competitions are the Australian Football League (men's) and AFL Women's, these are the most popular of any code with millions of national viewers across the country. The AFL governs the code nationally through the AFL Commission. The AFL originated in Victoria and changed its name in 1990 after a successful program of national expansion.

While the AFL phased out state and territory representative matches as it expanded nationally (with the exception of occasional matches featuring Victoria), players can still represent their states up to the age of 19 through the AFL Under 16 Championships and AFL Under 19 Championships or through their lower tier (semi-professional) state competitions. 

Australia competes internationally mainly against New Zealand. Australia's men's team is currently undefeated. The underage men's team competes annually against New Zealand as the AFL Academy. Australia has also in the past fielded amateur teams against South Africa, Papua New Guinea and the United States but remains undefeated. Sides representing Indigenous Australia have competed against Papua New Guinea and South Africa.

History

It began in the Colony of Victoria in 1858, followed by the Colony of Queensland (1866) and Colony of New South Wales (1866); Colony of South Australia (1877); Colony of Tasmania (1879);  and, Colony of Western Australia (1881).

The first intercolonial representative match  was Victoria vs South Australia (1879).

Delegates representing the football associations of South Australia, Tasmania, Victoria and Queensland met in 1883 in order to standardise the rules across the colonies. The earliest governing body, the Australasian Football Council (later Australian National Football Council) dates back to this time.

Following a hiatus in Queensland (1892-1903) and New South Wales (1893-1903) it was revived after the Federation of Australia and expanded to the territories of the Australian Capital Territory (1911) and the Northern Territory (1916).

In Australian popular culture

The sport has had a significant impact on popular culture in its native Australia, capturing the imagination of Australian film, art, music, television and literature.

Audience

Attendance
Football is the most highly attended spectator sport in Australia. Government figures show that more than 2.5 million people (16.8% of the population) attended games in 1999. In 2005, a cumulative 6,283,788 people attended Australian Football League (AFL) premiership matches, a record for the competition. A further 307,181 attended NAB Cup pre-season matches and 117,552 attended Regional Challenge pre-season practice matches around the country. As of 2010, the AFL is one of only five professional sports leagues with an average attendance of over 30,000 per game.

As well as the AFL attendances, strong semi-professional state and local competitions also draw crowds. The South Australian SANFL drew an attendance in 2008 of 362,209 with an average of 3,773 per game, while the Western Australian WAFL drew an attendance of 219,205 with an average of 2,332 per game.

Television
According to OzTAM, in recent years, the AFL Grand Final has reached the top five programs across the five biggest cities in 2002, 2003, 2004, 2005 and 2006.  Australian rules football has achieved a #1 rating in the sports category in both 2004 and 2005.

Participation

Structure and competitions 

The most powerful organisation and competition within the game is the elite professional Australian Football League (AFL). The AFL is recognised by the Australian Sports Commission as being the National Sporting Organisation for Australian rules football. There are also seven state/territory-based organisations in Australia, most of which are affiliated to the AFL.  Most of these hold annual semi-professional club competitions while the others oversee more than one league. Local semi-professional or amateur organizations and competitions are affiliated to their state leagues.

National championships

Senior

The last senior national carnival was held in 1993 and the last match between interstate senior sides was held in 1999. Senior interstate competition is no longer contested by players from the Australian Football League. A one-off exhibition match featuring Victoria and a "dream team". However, the state leagues continue to compete in inter-league matches.

Under 18

The AFL Under 18 Championships are the annual national Australian rules football championships for players aged 18 years or younger and includes teams from each Australian state or Territory. The competition is monitored by AFL recruiters and frequently seen as the second biggest pathway for junior players to the fully professional Australian Football League. The competition is currently sponsored by the National Australia Bank (NAB). The competition receives an increasing amount of coverage in the media, however still lags behind the TAC Cup in terms of interest in Victoria.

See also 
 Australian Football League
 Australian Institute of Sport
 List of Australian rules football clubs in Australia
 Soccer in Australia

Books

References